Paul Appermont (born 1946 in Bilzen) is a Belgian businessman. Together with Joos Horsten, he laid the foundation of Xi'an Janssen Pharmaceutical. Appermont is a member of the board of EuropaBio.

Education
Appermont graduated with a PhD in Law at the Katholieke Universiteit Leuven (Leuven, Belgium) and in International Relations at the Graduate Institute of International Studies (IUHEI) (Geneva, Switzerland).

Career
Paul Appermont started his career at Janssen Pharmaceutica as company lawyer. In 1979 he and Joos Horsten were sent to Xi'an, the capital of Shaanxi province, in the People's Republic of China by Dr. Paul Janssen to prepare for the establishment of a pharmaceutical company. In 1986 he started working for Biogen in Switzerland as a Vice President of trade and licensing. In 1896 he joined Jean-Louis Gentilini in the development of Medicard. He now works as a consultant for Innogenetics and the biotech industry.

Notes

References
 Trends, Ik ben Paul Janssen nog altijd dankbaar, 24 April 2008, pp. 132–135
 Europabio (board)
 Geerdt Magiels, Paul Janssen. Pionier in farma en in China, Houtekiet, 2005.

1946 births
Belgian businesspeople
Flemish businesspeople
KU Leuven alumni
Johnson & Johnson people
Living people
Graduate Institute of International and Development Studies alumni